Salman Al Khalifa (born 24 March 1976) is a Bahraini racing driver currently competing in the Bahrain International Circuit 2000cc Challenge. Having previously competed in the TCR International Series.

Racing career
Al Khalifa began his career in 2007 in the Bahrain International Circuit 2000cc Challenge, he still races there and currently leads the 2016 championship standings. He previously won the championship in 2008, taking 14 wins from 16 possible, finishing on the podium in every race.

In March 2016 it was announced that he would race in the TCR International Series at his home event at the Bahrain International Circuit, driving a SEAT León Cup Racer for Bas Koeten Racing.

Racing record

Complete TCR International Series results
(key) (Races in bold indicate pole position) (Races in italics indicate fastest lap)

References

External links
 

1976 births
Living people
TCR International Series drivers
Bahraini racing drivers
T-Sport drivers
British Formula Three Championship drivers
Walter Lechner Racing drivers
Porsche Supercup drivers
OAK Racing drivers